90 Day Fiancé is an American reality television series on TLC that follows couples who have applied for or received a K-1 visa, available uniquely to foreign fiancés of U.S. citizens, and therefore have 90 days to marry each other. The series debuted on January 12, 2014, and has run for 9 seasons.

The series has eighteen spin-offs, including 90 Day Fiancé: Happily Ever After, which documents past 90 Day Fiancé couples after their marriage; 90 Day Fiancé: Before the 90 Days, which follows couples who met online but have not yet started the K-1 visa process; and 90 Day Fiancé: The Other Way, a series where the American partner moves to their partner's home country instead of vice versa. The original series and its spinoffs are collectively referred to by TLC parent company Warner Bros. Discovery, and some others, as the "90 Day Fiancé Universe", or simply the "90 Day Universe".

Premise
The show is based on the K-1 visa process. This visa allows the fiancé from a foreign country to travel to the USA to live with his or her prospective American spouse. The purpose of the K-1 Visa is to provide time for the couple to make arrangements and have a marriage ceremony. Each couple is required to sign documents stating their intent to marry as part of the visa process. If the couple does not marry within 90 days, the beneficiary must leave the country (and the US citizen may have to travel to the beneficiary's foreign country). The couple may face language barriers, culture shock, the stigma of being thought of as a "mail-order bride", and skepticism from friends and family.

Cast

Season 1

Season 2

Season 3

Season 4

Season 5

Season 6

Season 7

Season 8

Season 9

Episodes

Spin-offs

90 Day Fiancé: Happily Ever After?
90 Day Fiancé: Happily Ever After? is a documentary series on TLC and a spin-off of 90 Day Fiancé. The series was announced in August 2016 and follows six couples from previous seasons of 90 Day Fiancé, documenting their relationships post-marriage. The series debuted on September 11, 2016, following the premiere of season 4 of 90 Day Fiancé. The first season concluded in November 2016 with a two-part "Tell All" special and an announcement that they had been renewed for season 2, which premiered on June 25, 2017. The third season premiered on May 20, 2018; season 4 premiered on April 28, 2019; season 5 premiered on June 14, 2020; and season 6 premiered on April 25, 2021. Season 7 is set to premiere on August 28, 2022 and included a spin to the Tell All, where we as viewers got to see the couples on the stage and off.

90 Day Fiancé: Before the 90 Days
In November 2016, TLC announced a second spin-off series titled 90 Day Fiancé: Before the 90 Days, which premiered on August 6, 2017. It chronicles the stories of couples whose relationships started online meeting in person for the first time. The second season premiered on August 5, 2018; season 3 on August 4, 2019; season 4 on February 23, 2020; and season 5 on December 12, 2021. Casting for season 6 had already begun by the end of season 5 despite the show not yet being renewed.

90 Day Fiancé: What Now?
In March 2017, TLC announced a spin-off series, 90 Day Fiancé: What Now?, available only on TLCgo. Updates about 90 Day alumni were initially released online on July 30, 2017, then combined into episodes and aired in a two-part special on September 17 and 24. The 2018 edition was also first uploaded online and this time was a three-part special over July 15, 22, and 29. Unlike the previous two seasons, season 3 contained five full episodes. The fourth season was made up of seven episodes, which were released between April and June 2020. As of August 2, 2022, the show has not been cancelled or renewed.

90 Day Fiancé: The Other Way
90 Day Fiancé: The Other Way was announced in May 2019 and aired on June 3. The spin-off is dedicated to couples where the American partner marries their partner abroad and moves to their country.

Other spin-offs 
In addition to those above, 90 Day Fiancé has a number of spinoffs:
 Pillow Talk - Announced in April 2019, 90 Day Fiancé: Pillow Talk is a 90 Day alumni reaction show 
 The Family Chantel - This spinoff follows Chantel and Pedro from season 4 as they navigate marriage.
 Just Landed - This online-only series highlights the first 24 hours after the couple arrives in the United States.
 Self-Quarantined - Started in response to the COVID-19 pandemic, Self-Quarantined was a 5-episode limited series following the format of 90 Day Fiancé but with couples filming themselves rather than being filmed by a camera crew.
 B90 Strikes Back! - This spinoff premiered on June 22, 2020 and focuses on Before the 90 Days alumni responding to viewers' critiques and questions.
 Darcey & Stacey - Twin sisters Stacey and Darcey Silva navigate their respective relationships. Season 3 aired in early 2022.
 HEA Strikes Back! - Happily Ever After alumni and their families watch the episodes, look at social media, and discuss.
 90 Day Bares All - A talk-show style program featuring uncensored interviews with 90 Day alumni and bonus footage from their seasons. It premiered on January 4, 2021 on discovery+.
 90 Day Diaries - 90 Day alumni film their day-to-day lives without a camera crew.
 The Other Way Strikes Back! - Like B90 Strikes Back! and HEA Strikes Back!, this spinoff shows The Other Way cast responding to questions and criticism.
 90 Day Journey - This spinoff focuses on a fan favorite couple and documents their story from the start.
 90 Day: The Single Life - Former cast members whose relationships ended during or after the show start dating again.
 90 Day: The Single Life: Pillow Talk - A companion series to The Single Life that follows the same premise as Pillow Talk.
 90 Day: Love in Paradise - Couples who found love in the Caribbean and are hopeful their relationships will continue, despite the miles and drama between them.

References

2010s American reality television series
2014 American television series debuts
English-language television shows
Television shows set in North America
TLC (TV network) original programming